The Koruko Ama Birjinaren Scholla Cantorum, which adopted its current name, Koruko Ama Birjinaren Eskola, in  and nowadays commonly known as Eskola, is an cultural and arts association founded in  in San Sebastián by Juan Urteaga. Initially, it had a choir, but a dance company emerged soon. In the 1960s, the music band was created, performing together with the dance company ever since. All three groups are active as of today. The first performance of the association was held in Easter : the founding date of Eskola is set to be .

Eskola is a member of the Union of Basque Dancers, appointed under the division of the Gipuzkoan Union of Basque Dancers.

History

Choreographies 

 Aingerutxo
 Amaia Opera
 Music: Ezpata-dantza of the Amaia opera (Jesus Guridi)
 Ametsak
 Choreography: Josetxo Fuentes
 Music: traditional
 Choreography based on the activities of the 18th century trading company Royal Gipuzkoan Company of Caracas (2 acts).
 Arin-arina
 Balea
 Music: Balearen bertsoak (Benito Lertxundi)
 El caserío
 Choreography: Josetxo Fuentes
 Music: El caserío: preludio acto II (Jesús Guridi)
 Choreography composed for the prologue of the 2nd act of the zarzuela El Caserío.
 Donostiako Martxa
 Choreography: Josetxo Fuentes
 Music: Raimundo Sarriegui
 Donostiako Martxa Zaharra
 Choreography: Josetxo Fuentes
 Music: Jose Juan Santesteban
 Official zortziko march existing in Donostia in the 19th century.
 Erriberako jota
 Music: Jota Navarra (Enrique Zelaia)
 Erromeria
 Music: traditional/Sergio Garzes
 Euskal Musikaren Gorespena
 Music: Euskal Musikaren Gorespena (José Uruñuela)
 Eusko Irudiak
 Music: Euzko irudiak: ezpata-dantza (Jesus Guridi)
 Fandangoa
 Choreography: Josetxo Fuentes
 Music: traditional
 Based on the couple dancing (suelto) championship held every year in Segura (Gipuzkoa).
 Gernika
 Choreography: Josetxo Fuentes
 Music: Pablo Sorozabal
 Herribehera
 Choreography: Josetxo Fuentes
 Music: Herribehera (Benito Lertxundi)
 Traditional dance composed of two parts; in the first one, the dancers represent the beds of the Coat of arms of Navarre; in the second part, the dancers represent the Coat of arms of Navarre.
 Hirugarren Hegoa
 Music: Txoria txori (writer: Joxean Artze; music: Mikel Laboa)
 Hotsean
 Choreography: Josetxo Fuentes and Juan Luis Unzurrunzaga
 Music: Baga Biga Higa (Mikel Laboa)
 Ipuina
 Music: Euskal pizkundea (Benito Lertxundi)  
 Maite
 Choreography: Josetxo Fuentes
 Music: Pablo Sorozabal
 Represents the rivalry between two groups of female dancers, each showing their ability to perform.
 Oleskari Zaharra
 Choreography: Josetxo Fuentes
 Music: Jose de Olaizola
 Composed for the Oleskari Zarra opera.
 Salazar
 Choreography: Josetxo Fuentes
 Based on the traditional dances from the Salazar Valley in Navarre.
 Sorgiñak
 Txanton Piperri
 Urketariak
 Choreography: Josetxo Fuentes
 Music: Sergio Garzes
 Composed in the tribute of the men, and especially women, who used to go the fountains lying next to the cannons of the Old Town in San Sebastián to look for warter.
 Zortzikoa

Festivals 

The Eskola dance company, together with other companies in Donostia, organizes the Lauarin dance festival in the city at the end of June every year.

The Gardeners' Comparsa 

Since then, Eskola is responsible for representing the Gardeners' Comparsa during Carnival in San Sebastian, as well as other acts of special character.

Tanborrada 

Koruko Ama Birjinaren Eskola has a company parading in the Tamborrada since . Both current and former dancers and choristers take part in the company; the total number of members is as high as 145,100 barrels and 45 drums. During the San Sebastian day (January 20), the company parades between 5p.m. and 9p.m. along the following streets: Aldapeta – Easo – Zubieta – Marina – San Martin – Urbieta – Larramendi – Errege Katolikoak – Koldo Mitxelena – Urdaneta – Hondarribia – San Martin – Getaria – Arrasate – Hondarribia – Askatasunaren Etorbidea – Urbieta – San Bartolome – Aldapeta. The company stops at several places during the parade to perform Raimundo Sarriegi's San Sebastian martxa.

See also 
 Basque dance
 Tamborrada

References

External links 
 Koruko Ama Birjinaren Eskola
 Euskal Dantzarien Biltzarra

Basque
Basque culture
European folk dances
San Sebastián
Festivals in San Sebastián